Eucalyptus globoidea, commonly known as the white stringybark, is a tree that is endemic to near-coastal areas of south-eastern Australia. It has rough, stringy bark, often furrowed on the trunk, glossy, lance-shaped to egg-shaped, often curved leaves, oval to spindle-shaped green to yellowish flower buds, white flowers and small, more or less spherical to hemispherical fruit.

Description
The bark is grey to reddish brown and stringy, often furrowed on the trunk. The operculum is cone-shaped and about as long and wide as the flower cup. The stamens are white. Flowering occurs from July to February but mostly from September to January.

Taxonomy and naming
Eucalyptus globoidea was first formally described in 1927 by William Blakely who published the description in Journal and Proceedings of the Royal Society of New South Wales. The specific epithet (globoidea) is derived from the Latin word globoideus meaning "globoid", referring to the shape of the fruit.

Distribution and habitat
White stringbark grows in forest and woodland on hills and slopes on the coast and nearby tablelands, south from Woolgoolga in New South Wales to near Melbourne in Victoria.

Globoidnan A is a lignan found in E. globoidea. This molecule has been found to inhibit the action of HIV integrase, an enzyme which is responsible for the introduction of HIV viral RNA into a host's cellular DNA.

References

globoidea
Myrtales of Australia
Trees of Australia
Flora of New South Wales
Flora of Victoria (Australia)
Plants described in 1927
Taxa named by William Blakely